Mangana Kaiyalli Manikya is a 2013 Indian Kannada-language comedy film directed by Rajendra Karanth in his directorial debut and starring Ramesh Aravind and Harshika Poonacha.

Cast 
Ramesh Aravind as Manohar a.k.a. Manu
Harshika Poonacha as Manohar's fiancé
Rangayana Raghu as Prabhu
Ravishankar Gowda as Ranganna

Production 
Rajendra Karanth, worked on the directorial team of Ramesh Aravind's directorial ventures such as Nammanna Don (2012). The film was shot in Bidadi, Bangalore and Mysore.

Release and reception 
The film was initially scheduled to release in March of 2013, but it was delayed to July of 2013.

A critic from The Times of India rated the film  out of 5 and wrote that "The neat comedy subject with laughter every moment is for the entire family. The climax could have been better". A critic from Indiaglitz wrote that "When Ramesh Aravind and Rajendra Karanth is combination there will be no shortfall for laugh riot. This is what just happened in this hilarious family package".

References